The Battle of Gorni Dubnik was a battle in the Russo-Turkish War on 24 October 1877. In an effort to reduce the fortress of Pleven quicker, Russian forces began targeting garrisons along the Ottoman supply and communications route. A significant garrison had been reduced at the Battle of Lovcha in September. General Joseph Vladimirovich Gourko was called up from the Shipka Pass area to deal with more of the garrisons protecting Pleven.

On October 24 Gourko attacked the fortress of Gorni-Dubnik. The Russian attack met heavy resistance but two other Russian columns were able to easily push back the Ottoman lines. The Finnish Guard sharpshooter battalion participated on the battle and stormed the fortress walls. Gourko continued the attacks and the garrison commander Ahmed Hifzi Pasha surrendered. Within the month several more Ottoman garrisons were to fall including Orhanie. By October 24 the Russian army had surrounded Plevna which capitulated December 10.

The battle is commemorated in the Finnish Guard Regiment March. October 24 is the honorary day of the descendant of the Finnish Guards' Rifle Battalion, the Finnish Guard Jaeger Regiment.

See also
 Battles of the Russo-Turkish War (1877–1878)

References

Sources 

 
 Sword of the Motherland Historical Foundation
 Compton's Home Library: Battles of the World CD-ROM

External link

Gorni Dubnik
Gorni-Dubnik 1877
1877 in Bulgaria
Gorni Dubnik
History of Pleven Province
October 1877 events